Scott McCuaig (born June 5, 1984 in Surrey, British Columbia) is a retired professional Canadian football defensive lineman. He most recently played for the BC Lions. He was drafted by the Hamilton Tiger-Cats of the Canadian Football League in the third round of the 2009 CFL Draft. He played CIS football for the UBC Thunderbirds, as a standout defensive lineman, sharing the single season record for QB sacks (11), named Canada West’s MOP, and in 2021 was named to UBC’s “All-Decade Team”

McCuaig was signed by the Hamilton Tiger-Cats on May 28, 2009, following the 2009 CFL Draft. He was placed on the practice roster on June 29, 2009, at the conclusion of the pre-season. On August 19, 2009, unhappy with being placed on the practice roster and seeing an opportunity to return to British Columbia, he requested a release from the Tiger-Cats and signed with the BC Lions on August 28, 2009.
Following his football career he became a firefighter in BC’s Lower Mainland.

References

External links
UBC Thunderbirds bio

1984 births
Living people
BC Lions players
Canadian football defensive linemen
Hamilton Tiger-Cats players
Players of Canadian football from British Columbia
Sportspeople from Surrey, British Columbia
UBC Thunderbirds football players